Oberea acuta is a species of longhorn beetle in the tribe Saperdini in the genus Oberea, discovered by Gressitt in 1951.

References

A
Beetles described in 1951